This is a list of bread products made in or originating from Britain. British cuisine is the specific set of cooking traditions and practices associated with the United Kingdom. Bread prepared from mixed grains was introduced to Great Britain around 3700 BC.

Savoury

 
 Griddle/ pancake
 Staffordshire oatcake  – called oat cakes by locals
 Crumpet (also often served sweet)
 Pikelet
 Griddle scone 

 Bread
 Barley bread
 Rowie
 Cockle bread

 Loaf
 Cottage loaf
 Manchet 
 Milk roll – also known as a 'Blackpool milk roll'.
 Pan loaf 
 Plain loaf
 Plaited bread

 Bun
 Barm cake

 Flatbread
 Bannock
 Breakfast muffin
 Farl
 Scuffler Bread cake
 Oat cake
 Stottie cake
 Tattie scone

Sweet

 Bara brith 
 Bath bun 
 Chelsea bun 
 Colston bun 
 Dripping cake
 Hot cross bun 
 Iced bun 
 Lardy cake
 London bun 
 Saffron bun 
 Scone (also often savoury)
 Teacake
 Sally Lunn bun
Welsh cake

See also

 Bread in Europe#United Kingdom
 English cuisine
 Cream tea or Devonshire/Cornish tea
 List of baked goods
 List of bread rolls
 List of breads
 List of British desserts
 List of English dishes
 List of quick breads
 Northern Irish cuisine
 Scottish cuisine
 Welsh cuisine

References

 
Lists of breads
Breads